Daria Kasatkina was the defending champion, but chose not to participate.

Maryna Zanevska won the title, defeating Camilla Rosatello in the final, 6–1, 6–3.

Seeds

Main draw

Finals

Top half

Bottom half

External Links
 Main draw

L'Open Emeraude Solaire de Saint-Malo - Singles
L'Open 35 de Saint-Malo